John James (1838  May 23, 1902) was a British-born American soldier in the U.S. Army who served with the 5th U.S. Cavalry during the Texas–Indian Wars. He was one of seven men who received the Medal of Honor for gallantry by defending the "Lyman Train" against a war party of Kiowa and Comanche at the Upper Washita River in Texas on September 9–11, 1874.

Biography
John James was born near Manchester, England, in 1838. After emigrating to the United States, he enlisted in the U.S. Army in Albany, New York. He became a member of the 5th U.S. Cavalry and participated in campaigns against the Plains Indians during the early-1870s.

Lyman train defense

On the morning of September 9, 1874, James was assigned to a small cavalry escort escorting a supply train to General Nelson Miles expedition force camped at Battle Creek. This train consisted of 36 wagons and was called Lyman train after Captain Lyman, the man heading the cavalry escort protecting the train.

As the supply train emerged from a canyon on the Upper Washita River, they were set upon by a large Indian war party of Kiowa and Comanche. Despite the overwhelming numbers, the cavalry troopers fiercely resisted the hostiles. Although a battalion from the 8th U.S. Cavalry arrived on the second day, the defenders endured continuous gunfire and two major Indian assaults numbering over 400 warriors. With temperatures as high as 100 degrees, water became scarce and efforts to reach a nearby watering hole were made impossible while surrounded by the enemy. The Lyman Train defenders held out for almost a week before help arrived on September 14, 1874.

James was one of seven soldiers cited for "gallantry in action" during the three-day battle and received the Medal of Honor on April 23, 1875. He died in Washington, D.C., on May 23, 1902, and is interred at the United States Soldiers' and Airmen's Home National Cemetery.

Medal of Honor citation
Rank and organization: Corporal, 5th U.S. Infantry. Place and date: At Upper Wichita, Tex., 9–11 September 1874. Entered service at: ------. Birth: England. Date of issue: 23 April 1875.

Citation:

Gallantry in action.

See also

List of Medal of Honor recipients for the Indian Wars

References

Further reading
Konstantin, Phil. This Day in North American Indian History: Important Dates in the History of North America's Native Peoples for Every Calendar Day. New York: Da Capo Press, 2002.

External links

1838 births
1902 deaths
American military personnel of the Indian Wars
United States Army Medal of Honor recipients
Military personnel from Manchester
United States Army soldiers
English-born Medal of Honor recipients
English emigrants to the United States
Burials at United States Soldiers' and Airmen's Home National Cemetery
American Indian Wars recipients of the Medal of Honor